The 2018–19 season was Al-Wehda's 74th season in their existence and first season back in the Pro League following their promotion last season. Along with competing in the Pro League, the club also participated in the King Cup.

The season covers the period from 1 July 2018 to 30 June 2019.

Players

Squad information

Transfers

In

Loans in

Out

Loans out

Pre-season friendlies

Competitions

Overall

Last Updated: 16 May 2019

Saudi Pro League

League table

Results summary

Results by round

Matches
All times are local, AST (UTC+3).

King Cup

All times are local, AST (UTC+3).

Statistics

Squad statistics
As of 16 May 2019.

|-
!colspan="14"|Players who left during the season

|}

Goalscorers

Last Updated: 16 May 2019

Assists

Last Updated: 16 May 2019

Clean sheets

Last Updated: 11 May 2019

References

Al-Wehda Club (Mecca) seasons
Wehda